Bacotia claustrella, the shining smoke, is a moth of the Psychidae family. It is found in large parts of Europe, except Ireland, Norway, Finland, the Baltic region, Ukraine, the western and southern part of the Balkan Peninsula and the Iberian Peninsula.

The wingspan is about 13–15 mm for males. Female are wingless. The forewings of the males are brown with a dark mark in the central part. The hindwings are greyish. Adults are on wing in June and July.

The larvae feed on lichens. They build a case covered with lichen and fragments of bark. Larvae can be found from August to May, overwintering in the larval stage.

References

External links

Moths described in 1845
Psychidae
Moths of Europe